This is a list of the Spanish Singles number-ones of 1962.

Chart history

See also
1962 in music
List of number-one hits (Spain)

References

1962
Spain Singles
Number-one singles